Jyrki Välivaara (born May 30, 1976) is a Finnish professional ice hockey defenceman who currently plays for Metallurg Novokuznetsk in the Kontinental Hockey League. In the past he played for JYP of the SM-liiga.
He was on Finland's IIHF gold medal-winning team on 2011.

References

External links

Living people
JYP Jyväskylä players
Finnish ice hockey defencemen
1976 births
Sportspeople from Jyväskylä
21st-century Finnish people